Flamur Bajrami (born 10 February 1997) is a Kosovo Albanian professional footballer who plays as a midfielder for Kosovan club Llapi.

Club career

Early career
In April 2014, Bajrami played in a Pristina Under-17 Regional League Tournament and was the best scorer in Group B with two goals. In June 2015, he was at trial with the reputable Hajduk Split B, but didn't make the cut.

Vëllaznimi
On 28 December 2015, Bajrami joined First Football League of Kosovo side Vëllaznimi, on a season-long contract.

Tirana
On 26 August 2016, Bajrami joined Albanian Superliga side Tirana. On 23 October 2016, he made his debut in a 2–1 away defeat against Luftëtari Gjirokastër after coming on as a substitute at 65th minute in place of Gjergji Muzaka.

Return to Vëllaznimi
On 18 January 2018, Bajrami joined Football Superleague of Kosovo side Vëllaznimi.

Llapi
On 5 January 2019, Bajrami joined Football Superleague of Kosovo side Llapi, on a two and a half year contract.

References

External links

1997 births
Living people
Sportspeople from Mitrovica, Kosovo
Association football midfielders
Kosovan footballers
KF Vëllaznimi players
KF Tirana players
KF Llapi players
Football Superleague of Kosovo players
Kategoria Superiore players
Kosovan expatriate footballers
Expatriate footballers in Albania
Kosovan expatriate sportspeople in Albania